1985 saw many sequels and prequels in video games, such as Super Mario Bros. and Kung Fu, along with new titles such as Commando, Duck Hunt, Gauntlet, Ghosts 'n Goblins, Gradius, Hang-On, Space Harrier and The Way of the Exploding Fist. The year's highest-grossing arcade video games were Hang-On and Karate Champ in the United States, and Commando in the United Kingdom. The year's bestselling home system was the Nintendo Entertainment System (Famicom) for the second year in a row, while the year's bestselling home video game was Super Mario Bros.

Financial performance
Meanwhile, the arcade game industry began recovering in 1985.

Highest-grossing arcade games

Japan
In Japan, the following titles were the top-grossing arcade video games on the bi-weekly Game Machine charts in 1985.

United Kingdom and United States
In the United Kingdom and United States, the following titles were the highest-grossing arcade games of 1985.

Best-selling home systems

Best-selling home video games

Japan
The year's best-selling game was Super Mario Bros. for the Family Computer (Famicom), later known as the Nintendo Entertainment System (NES) outside Japan. It eventually sold  cartridges by the end of 1985.

Game Machine magazine reported that more than ten Famicom games released between 1983 and 1985 had each sold over  cartridges in Japan by the end of 1985. The Magic Box lists fourteen Famicom games released between 1983 and 1985 that crossed  lifetime sales in Japan. At least 11 of the following 14 Famicom million-sellers released between 1983 and 1985 crossed  sales in Japan by the end of 1985.

United Kingdom
In the United Kingdom, the following titles were the top ten best-selling home video games of 1985, according to the annual Gallup software sales chart. The top ten titles were all home computer games.

Fighting games topped the UK software sales charts for two years in a row in the mid-1980s, with The Way of the Exploding Fist in 1985 and then the home computer conversions of Yie Ar Kung-Fu in 1986.

United States 
In the United States, the Software Publishers Association (SPA) began tracking home computer game sales in 1985. The following fourteen computer games received Gold Awards from the SPA for sales above 100,000 units in 1985 (but below the 250,000 units required for a Platinum Award).

Events
 August – The final issue of Electronic Games magazine is published.

Major awards
 The Way of the Exploding Fist won Game of the Year at the third Golden Joystick Awards (for best home computer game), and received the "Voted Best Game" award at the Saturday Superstore Viewer Awards.
 The sixth Arcade Awards are held, for games released during 1983–1984, with Star Wars winning best arcade game, Space Shuttle best console game, Ultima III: Exodus best computer game, and Zaxxon best standalone game.
 In Computer Gamer magazine's Game of the Year Awards, Elite won best home computer game of the year (with Way of the Exploding Fist as runner-up) and Commando won best coin-op game (with Paperboy as runner-up).

Business
 New companies: Cinemaware. Codemasters, Square Co., Titus, Tradewest, Westwood Studios
 Defunct: Adventure International, Bug-Byte, Edu-Ware, RDI Video Systems
 David Mullich and several other laid-off employees from Edu-Ware form Electric Transit, the first company to join Electronic Arts' new affiliated publisher program.

Notable releases

Games 
Arcade
 January – Konami releases Yie Ar Kung-Fu, which lays the foundations for modern fighting games.
 March – Tehkan releases Gridiron Fight, an American football sports game featuring the use of dual trackball controls.
 April – Atari Games releases Paperboy with a controller modeled after bicycle handlebars,
 May – Namco releases Metro-Cross.
 May – Konami releases Gradius in Japan (called Nemesis elsewhere).
 May – Capcom releases  Commando, a vertically-scrolling on-foot shooter which inspires many games with similar themes and gameplay.
 July – Namco releases Baraduke (Alien Sector in the US).
 July – Sega releases Hang-On by Yu Suzuki and AM2. It is the first of Sega's Super Scaler games. Its motorbike cabinet is controlled using the body, starting a "Taikan" ("to feel in the body") trend of motion controlled hydraulic cabinets in arcades some two decades before motion controls become popular on video game consoles.
 August – Atari Games releases Indiana Jones and the Temple of Doom as the first System 1 game to feature digitized speech from the 1984 movie.  Gameplay involves Indy freeing children from cages, whipping thugee guards and bats, an exciting minecar chase, a temple scene and a drawbridge scene.
 September 19 – Capcom releases Ghosts 'n Goblins, originally titled Makaimura in Japan. It was one of the most popular arcade games of the year, and went on to spawn a series of later games.
 September 20 – Namco releases Motos.
 October – Atari Games releases Gauntlet. Based on the lesser known Atari 8-bit game Dandy, Gauntlet is highly profitable, letting players insert additional quarters for more health.
 December – Sega releases Space Harrier by Yu Suzuki and AM2. It further develops the pseudo-3D sprite-scaling graphics of Hang-On and uses an analog flight stick for movement.
 December – Namco releases Sky Kid, a side-scrolling shooter allowing two players simultaneously.
 Tehkan releases Tehkan World Cup, which lays the foundations for association football/soccer games with an above view of the field.

Console

Hardware

Arcade
July – Sega releases the Space Harrier arcade hardware (also known as Sega Hang-On), the first of Sega's "Super Scaler" arcade system boards that allow pseudo-3D sprite-scaling at high frame rates. It displays 6144 colors on screen out of a 32,768 color palette.
 Namco begins development on the Namco System 21 around this time, as the first arcade board dedicated to 3D polygon graphics.

Computer
 January – Commodore releases their final 8-bit computer, the Commodore 128.
 June – Atari Corporation releases the 520ST, the first personal computer with a bit-mapped, color GUI.
 July 23 – Commodore releases the Amiga 1000 personal computer, the first in the Amiga family. It was not widely available until 1986.
 Atari replaces previous models in the Atari 8-bit family with the 65XE and 130XE, the latter of which has 128K bank-switched RAM.
 Discontinued: Coleco Adam, VIC-20

Console
 July 26 – Nintendo releases the Family Computer Robot, a peripheral for their Family Computer (Famicom) home video game console, in Japan.
 October 18 – the Nintendo Entertainment System (NES) home video game console, the export version of the Famicom, is launched for a limited test market in the United States, along with the R.O.B. (Robotic Operating Buddy) peripheral.
 October 20 – the Sega Mark III home video game console is launched in Japan.
 INTV Corporation releases the INTV III console.
 Telegames releases the Dina, a ColecoVision clone.
 Discontinued: ColecoVision

See also
1985 in games

References

 
Video games by year